Epsilontorquevirus is a genus in the family of Anelloviridae, in group II in the Baltimore classification. It encompasses the single species of the Torque teno tamarin virus.

References

External links 
ICTV Virus Taxonomy 2009
UniProt Taxonomy

Anelloviridae
Virus genera